Monkey Typhoon, known in Japan as , is a Japanese mixed-media project created by Avex Inc., consisting of a manga series and an anime television series. The project was first announced in June 2000, under the tentative title , with collaboration of writer . The series is loosely based on the 16th century novel Journey to the West.

The manga series, Assobot Goku, was written by Shin Kibayashi (under the pen name Jōji Arimori) and illustrated by Romu Aoi, serialized in Kodansha's shōnen manga magazine Weekly Shōnen Magazine from 2001 to 2002, with its chapters collected in seven tankōbon volumes. The 52-episode anime television series was animated by studio Egg and broadcast on TV Tokyo from October 2002 to September 2003.

Story
Monkey Typhoon tells the story of three —a form of robots whose general title is a portmanteau of the words association and robot— Goku, Tongo, and Joe. They are assisted in their journeys by Sanzo, a human, the son of the creator of the assobots, and Suzie, who joined them after her father was cured from the Destruction Virus. Later on they are joined by their former rivals Miyon and Shiyon. Their quest is to stop their world's destruction by collecting the legendary 49 keys to unlock Tokyo Metropolitan Government. Along the way, the assobots gain the ability to evolve further. Together, in their many voyages, they come across several foes and enemies such as Loki, Ryutaro Demon, the Quartet, King Doberman Pinscher, and many more, as well as grow united in their friendship.

Characters

A first generation assobot. His mission is to find the 49 Keys of the Apocalypse (actually he just wants to find the treasure where the key is located). He is accompanied with Suzie, Sanzo, Tongo, Joe and later with Meeyon and Shiyon. Goku looks mostly human, but he has a face that resembles a monkey, and he gets angry when they call him monkey. He has a robot horse called Skywalker and a magic metal weapon he calls a 'joystick' which lengthens or contracts to his will. Sanzo put a curse on him that will make him weak to all women and children. After he collected 6 keys, his appearance changed and acquired new abilities such as the improved "Easter Wind" and "Fire Vortex Revolution". He likes to chase pretty girls every time he arrives in town, which leads him to get a punch out of the air. In the end, Sanzo took off the curse from Goku and chose to go back in past, since Professor D's feather flew in a worm hole to the past, accompanied by his gang. His name, Goku, is made up of the Chinese characters for five and nine.

The one who forced Goku on the quest, he said he can only remove the curse when they arrive to the last city. He woke up after 1000 years of cold sleep, to stop the world's destruction by collecting the 49 keys. He has a magical harmonica that affects assobots, but not the ones who were infected by the Destruction Virus. He sometimes uses it to heal assobots or power up Goku's attacks. Like Goku, he collected 6 keys, which later on, changed the appearance of his harmonica and can heal assobots even with the virus. He serves as a big brother to Suzie. He is also the former lover of Rhea, the mother of all assobots. At the last part of the series, he fought off Ryutaro Demon along with Goku, Yazu and friends. After all the keys have been collected, all assobots that have been affected by the Destruction Virus have been cured. His last words (the last words in the series) are "The real treasure is none other than the treasure of the journey."

Suzie lost her dad in an attack of some infected assobots did to her city. When she was young, her father was telling her the legend, which leads her to join Goku and his friends to witness it. Although she does not have any abilities, she has a flying vehicle. Later she finds a bow which can produce a sound which affects assobots. Only Suzie can use it. At the last part of the series, Suzie is the last person who finished Ryutaro Demon by using the bow of sun to rest Ryutaro Demon's soul in peace. It is because she is the only one who understands what Ryutaro Demon feels. In the end, she, along with the gang, choose to go back with Goku in the past.

A worker assobot, but his mouth is never seen because he has it covered ninja style. He needs much water to survive. Goku himself said he is invincible when battling underwater. His weapon is called 'Feather Sword'. Later, like Goku, he collected 6 keys which can change his appearance and which can also change his weapon into 'Feather Blade'. He returned to the past along with Goku and friends, since the bandit group should never abandon each other.

A nurse assobot who looks like a fat cat that likes to eat. His weapon is called 'Chain Hammer'. Later, like Goku and Jo, he collected 6 keys, which can change his appearance and his weapon, making it the 'Megaton Hammer'. At the last part of the series, he fought off Ryutaro Demon along with Goku, Yazu and friends. He came back to past along with Goku and friends, since the bandit group should never abandon each other.

An assobot who looks almost like a human. Later, she joined Goku. Sanzo stated that Meeyon has similarities with Rhea. She has a little sister named Shiyon. She has a pet named Saati that can transform itself into a hoverboard which she uses to travel. Most of her attacks are candy based (bubblegum bomb, choco men, etc.). Later in the series, after collecting 6 keys, she gets a magical umbrella that she can be used to fly, used as a shield, or used to hypnotize somebody (she did this to escape Goku once but never used it again). At the last part of the series, she and Shiyon were the ones who found Ryutaro Demon's weakness. She and Shiyon came to the past with Goku and friends to find treasures.

Meeyon's little sister. Like Meeyon, she is an assobot and one of Ryutaro Demon's quartet. During her time as part of the quartet she used a Sitar played like a cello. She joined Goku so she can spy them in their journey. After she died due to the Destruction Virus, Sanzo revived her after his harmonica is changed by the 6 keys. She can transform or change into a pretty lady who looks like Meeyon, only with blue hair. She has a pet parrot that can transform into a walkie-talkie.

He is a third generation assobot. He is one of Ryutaro Demon's quartet. He dies but later gets revived in episode 33. Yazu is also armed with an elegantly designed scythe. He sacrificed himself for the group when he disagreed with Ryutaro Demon's plans in the last part of the series.

The mother of all assobots and former lover of Sanzo 1000 years before the series started. According to Sanzo, she has similarities with Meeyon but Sanzo stated that he can see Rei more on Goku than on Meeyon.

The main villain. Like Sanzo, he wants to find the keys for his sinister plans.
Casper

One of Ryutaro Demon's quartet. He has a violin.
Marty
One of Ryutaro Demon's quartet. He has a trumpet.
Marie

One of Ryutaro Demon's quartet. She has a set of drums.

Media

Manga
Written by Shin Kibayashi (under the pen name Jōji Arimori) and illustrated by Romu Aoi, the manga series  started in Kodansha's shōnen manga magazine Weekly Shōnen Magazine on December 26, 2001. It was later transferred to Magazine Special, where it ran from September 20, 2002, to October 20, 2003. Kodansha collected its chapters in seven tankōbon volumes, released from September 17, 2002, to November 17, 2003.

Anime
Produced by Avex Inc., Dentsu and TV Tokyo, animated by studio Egg and directed by Mamoru Hamatsu, Monkey Typhoon was broadcast for 52 episodes on TV Tokyo from October 1, 2003, to September 30, 2003.

Theme songs 
Opening Themes
  by BoA (1–25)
  by Dream (26–52)
Ending Themes
 "I Wake Your Love" by Move (1–13)
  by Janne da Arc (14–25)
 "Burning Dance" by Move (26–38)
 "LolitA☆Strawberry in summer" by Sweets (39–51)
  (52)

References

External links
  
 

Chinese mythology in anime and manga
Kodansha manga
Shin Kibayashi
Shōnen manga
TV Tokyo original programming
Television series by Sony Pictures Television
Works based on Journey to the West